Kilkivan  is a town and locality in the Gympie Region of Queensland, Australia.

Geography 
One Mile Creek meanders through the town, east of the Wide Bay Highway. The town lies in the Mary River drainage basin.

Rossmore is a neighbourhood within the locality to the south-west of the town of Kilkivan.

History

Kilkivan was first inhabited by the Wakka Wakka tribe of the Australian Aboriginal peoples.  The town was first settled by Europeans in the 1840s. Queensland’s first gold discovery was at Kilkivan in 1852 and subsequent findings escalated into a gold rush in the 1860s. The town was named for a pastoral run owned by pastoralist John Daniel MacTaggart (1823–1871) after his father's farm name near Drumlemble, Kintyre, Scotland.  The nearby Australian 'Glenbarr' property owned by MacTaggart was also named for a nearby Scottish farm.

Kilkivan Post Office opened on 8 June 1868. It was known as Neureum between 1876 and 1881.

Kilkivan State School opened in March 1876.

In 1883, a court house, police quarters and lock-up was built at a total cost of £748 10s. It was a wooden building with an iron roof and consisted of the court house, two bedrooms, sitting room, kitchen, verandahs, and two cells.

The Nanango railway line opened in December 1886 as far as Kilkivan. The locality was also served by Mouingba and Bular railway stations on the same line. Anticipation of the line opening brought an increase in the desire to build near the station, which was located on a goldfield.  The  line was officially closed in early 2010.

The land was offered for selection for the establishment of small farms on 17 April 1887.

St Matthew's Anglican Church was dedicated in 1888 by Reverend E. C. Osbourne of Gympie. Its closure circa 2013 was approved by Bishop Rob Nolan.

Fairfield State School opened circa 1915. In 1916  it was renamed Rossmore State School. It was closed circa 1943.

The Kilkivan Library opened in 1967.

The Kilkivan War Memorial commemorates those of the district who served in the wars. It was dedicated on 28 March 1996.

Heritage listings 
Kilkivan has a number of heritage-listed sites, including:
 Rossmore Road: Mount Clara smelter

Economy

Major industries today include tourism, beef, dairying and forestry.

Education 

Kilkivan State School is a primary and secondary (P-10) school for boys and girls operated by the Queensland Government at 6 Council Street. In 2016, the school had an enrolment of 97 students with 14 teachers (12 full-time equivalent) and 10 non-teaching staff (7 full-time equivalent).

Amenities 

The Gympie Regional Council operates a public library at 31 Bligh Street, Kilkivan.

The Kilkivan branch of the Queensland Country Women's Association meets at the CWA hall at 6 Park Street. The building was built as the council chambers of the Division of Kilkivan (later the Shire of Kilkivan) at 26 Bligh Street in 1890, but was purchased and relocated to its present site in 1958. The QCWA branch in Kilkivan was established in 1926.

Kilkivan Bowls Club is in Crescent Street.

Attractions
The Kilkivan and District Museum and information centre in the main street features extensive displays which pay tribute to the region's early pioneers.

The country town features parks and restored historical buildings.  Kilkivan has antique stores, a historical walk, and a cafe and B&B housed in the town's original bank.

Kilkivan is one of the few towns on the Bicentennial National Trail. A stone plaque commemorates the opening of the trail in 1988.

The Kilkivan Great Horse Ride is held annually in April.  Over 1,000 horses and riders start from five points around Kilkivan and travel  along parts of the National Trail to Kilkivan for the Grand Parade down the main street.

The Kilkivan to Kingaroy Rail Trail follows the old railway line between the two towns. The trail from Kilkivan to Murgon is unsealed. A low level bridge was opened across Wide Bay Creek in October 2021. Short distances between towns means coffee is never far away.

References

External links

 
 

Towns in Queensland
Wide Bay–Burnett
Gympie Region
Localities in Queensland